Elections to the Baseball Hall of Fame for 1970 followed the system of annual elections in place since 1968. The Baseball Writers' Association of America (BBWAA) voted by mail to select from recent major league players and elected Lou Boudreau. The Veterans Committee met in closed sessions to consider executives, managers, umpires, and earlier major league players. It selected three people: Earle Combs, Ford Frick, and Jesse Haines. A formal induction ceremony was held in Cooperstown, New York, on July 27, 1970, with Commissioner of Baseball Bowie Kuhn presiding.

BBWAA election
The BBWAA was authorized to elect players active in 1950 or later, but not after 1964; the ballot included candidates from the 1969 ballot along with selected players, chosen by a screening committee, whose last appearance was in 1964. All 10-year members of the BBWAA were eligible to vote.

Voters were instructed to cast votes for up to 10 candidates; any candidate receiving votes on at least 75% of the ballots would be honored with induction to the Hall. The ballot consisted of 46 players; a total of 300 ballots were cast, with 225 votes required for election. A total of 2,302 individual votes were cast, an average of 7.67 per ballot.

Candidates who were eligible for the first time are indicated here with a dagger (†). The one candidate who received at least 75% of the vote and was elected is indicated in bold italics; candidates who have since been elected in subsequent elections are indicated in italics.

Joe Gordon, Tommy Henrich and Bucky Walters were on the ballot for the final time.

Players eligible for the first time who were not included on the ballot were: Gus Bell, Hal Brown, Bud Daley, Hank Foiles, Paul Foytack, Don Hoak, Sam Jones, Charlie Maxwell, Cal McLish, Bubba Phillips, Wally Post, Pete Runnels, Al Smith, Hal Smith, Gene Stephens, Tom Sturdivant, Johnny Temple, Lee Walls and Dick Williams (who would eventually be inducted into the Hall of Fame as a manager in 2008).

J. G. Taylor Spink Award 
Sid Mercer (1880–1945) received the J. G. Taylor Spink Award honoring a baseball writer. The award was voted at the December 1969 meeting of the BBWAA, and included in the summer 1970 ceremonies.

References

External links
1970 Election at www.baseballhalloffame.org

Baseball Hall of Fame balloting
Hall of Fame balloting